A charitable organization or charity is an organization whose primary objectives are philanthropy and social well-being (e.g. educational, religious or other activities serving the public interest or common good).

The legal definition of a charitable organization (and of charity) varies between countries and in some instances regions of the country. The regulation, the tax treatment, and the way in which charity law affects charitable organizations also vary. Charitable organizations may not use any of their funds to profit individual persons or entities. (However, some charitable organizations have come under scrutiny for spending a disproportionate amount of their income to pay the salaries of their leadership).

Financial figures (e.g. tax refund, revenue from fundraising, revenue from sale of goods and services or revenue from investment) are indicators to assess the financial sustainability of a charity, especially to charity evaluators. This information can impact a charity's reputation with donors and societies, and thus the charity's financial gains.

Charitable organizations often depend partly on donations from businesses. Such donations to charitable organizations represent a major form of corporate philanthropy.

In order to meet the exempt organizational test requirements, a charity has to be exclusively organized and operated. 
In order to receive and pass the exemption test, a charitable organization must follow the public interest and all exempt income should be for the public interest.
For example, in many countries of the Commonwealth, charitable organizations must demonstrate that they provide a public benefit.

History

Early systems 
Until the mid-18th century, charity was mainly distributed through religious structures (such as the English Poor Laws of 1601), almshouses and bequests from the rich. Christianity, Judaism and Islam incorporated significant charitable elements from their very beginnings and dāna (alms-giving) has a long tradition in Hinduism, Jainism, Buddhism and Sikhism. Charities provided education, health, housing and even prisons. Almshouses were established throughout Europe in the Early Middle Ages to provide a place of residence for poor, old and distressed people; King Athelstan of England (reigned 924–939) founded the first recorded almshouse in York in the 10th century.

Enlightenment charity

In the Enlightenment era, charitable and philanthropic activity among voluntary associations and rich benefactors became a widespread cultural practice. Societies, gentleman's clubs, and mutual associations began to flourish in England, and the upper-classes increasingly adopted a philanthropic attitude toward the disadvantaged. In England this new social activism was channeled into the establishment of charitable organizations; these proliferated from the middle of the 18th century.

This emerging upper-class fashion for benevolence resulted in the incorporation of the first charitable organizations. Captain Thomas Coram, appalled by the number of abandoned children living on the streets of  London, set up the Foundling Hospital in 1741 to look after these unwanted orphans in Lamb's Conduit Fields, Bloomsbury. This, the first such charity in the world, served as the precedent for incorporated associational charities in general.

Jonas Hanway, another notable philanthropist of the Enlightenment era, established The Marine Society in 1756 as the first seafarer's charity, in a bid to aid the recruitment of men to the navy. By 1763 the Society had recruited over 10,000 men; an Act of Parliament incorporated it in 1772. Hanway was also instrumental in establishing the Magdalen Hospital to rehabilitate prostitutes. These organizations were funded by subscription and run as voluntary associations. They raised public awareness of their activities through the emerging popular press and were generally held in high social regard – some charities received state recognition in the form of the royal charter.

Charities also began to adopt campaigning roles, where they would champion a cause and lobby the government for legislative change. This included organized campaigns against the ill treatment of animals and children and the campaign that eventually succeeded at the turn of the 19th century in ending the slave trade throughout the British Empire and within its considerable sphere of influence. (This process was however a lengthy one, which finally concluded when Saudi Arabia abolished slavery in 1962.)

The Enlightenment also saw growing philosophical debate between those who championed state intervention and those who believed that private charities should provide welfare. The Reverend Thomas Malthus (1766-1834), the political economist, criticized poor relief for paupers on economic and moral grounds and proposed leaving charity entirely to the private sector. His views became very influential and informed the Victorian laissez-faire attitude toward state intervention for the poor.

Growth during 19th century
During the 19th century a profusion of charitable organizations emerged to alleviate the awful conditions of the working class in the slums. The Labourer's Friend Society, chaired by Lord Shaftesbury in the United Kingdom in 1830, aimed to improve working-class conditions. It promoted, for example, the allotment of land to labourers for "cottage husbandry" that later became the allotment movement. In 1844 it became the first Model Dwellings Company – one of a group of organizations that sought to improve the housing conditions of the working classes by building new homes for them, at the same time receiving a competitive rate of return on any investment. This was one of the first housing associations, a philanthropic endeavour that flourished in the second half of the nineteenth century brought about by the growth of the middle class. Later associations included the Peabody Trust (originating in 1862) and the Guinness Trust (founded in 1890). The principle of philanthropic intention with capitalist return was given the label "five per cent philanthropy".

There was strong growth in municipal charities. The Brougham Commission led on to the Municipal Corporations Act 1835, which reorganized multiple local charities by incorporating them into single entities under supervision from local government.

Charities at the time, including the Charity Organization Society (established in 1869) tended to discriminate between the "deserving poor" who would be provided with suitable relief and the "underserving" or "improvident poor" who were regarded as the cause of their own woes through their idleness. Charities tended to oppose the provision of welfare by the state, due to the perceived demoralizing effect. Although minimal state involvement was the dominant philosophy of the period, there was still significant government involvement in the shape of statutory regulation and even limited funding.

Philanthropy became a very fashionable activity among the expanding middle classes in Britain and America. Octavia Hill (1838-1912) and John Ruskin (1819-1900) were an important force behind the development of social housing, and Andrew Carnegie (1835-1919) exemplified the large-scale philanthropy of the newly rich in industrialized America. In Gospel of Wealth (1889), Carnegie wrote about the responsibilities of great wealth and the importance of social justice. He established public libraries throughout the English-speaking countries as well as contributing large sums to schools and universities. A little over ten years after his retirement, Carnegie had given away over 90% of his fortune.

Towards the end of the 19th century, with the advent of the New Liberalism and the innovative work of Charles Booth on documenting working-class life in London, attitudes towards poverty began to change, which led to the first social liberalwelfare reforms, including the provision of old age pensions and free school-meals.

Since 1901 
During the 20th century charitable organizations such as Oxfam (established in 1947), Care International and Amnesty International greatly expanded, becoming large, multinational, non-governmental organizations with very large budgets.

Since the 21st century 
With the advent of the Internet, charitable organizations established a presence in online social media and started, for example, cyber-based humanitarian crowdfunding such as GoFundMe. Another charitable organization is Beyond the Crisis. This organization distributes food and resources to housing communities and homeless shelters in the U.S. It was established by young philanthropists Camden and Colton Francis.

By jurisdiction

Australia
The definition of charity in Australia is derived through English common law, originally from the Charitable Uses Act 1601, and then through several centuries of case law based upon it. In 2002, the federal government established an inquiry into the definition of a charity. The inquiry proposed a statutory definition of a charity, based on the principles developed through case law. This resulted in the Charities Bill 2003, which included limitations on involvement of charities in political campaigning, which many charities saw as an unwelcome departure from the case law. The government appointed a Board of Taxation inquiry to consult with charities on the bill. As a result of widespread criticism from charities, the government abandoned the bill.

The government then introduced what became the Extension of Charitable Purpose Act 2004, which did not attempt to codify the definition of a charitable purpose, but merely sought to clarify that certain purposes were charitable, whose charitable status had been subject to legal doubts. These purposes included childcare, self-help groups, and closed/contemplative religious orders.

To publicly raise funds, a charity in Australia must register in each Australian jurisdiction in which it intends to raise funds. In Queensland, for example, charities must register with the Queensland Office of Fair Trading. Also, any charity fundraising online must have approval in every Australian jurisdiction that requires them to do so, which is currently New South Wales, Queensland, Victoria, Tasmania, Western Australia, and the Australian Capital Territory. Many Australian charities have called on federal, state, and territory governments to enact uniform legislation to enable charities registered in a state or territory to be allowed to raise funds in all other Australian jurisdictions.

The Australian Charities and Not-For-Profits Commission (ACNC) commenced operations in December 2012 and regulates the approximately 56,000 non-profit organizations with tax exempt status, and about 600,000 other NPO in total and seeks to harmonise state-based fund-raising laws.

A Public Benevolent Institution (PBI) is a particular type of charity whose main purpose is to relieve suffering in the community, whether though poverty, sickness, or disability. Examples of institutions which might qualify include hospices, providers of subsidised housing and some not-for-profit aged care services.

Canada

Charities in Canada must be registered with the Charities Directorate of the Canada Revenue Agency. According to the Canada Revenue Agency:
A registered charity is an organization established and operated for charitable purposes, and must devote its resources to charitable activities. The charity must be resident in Canada, and cannot use its income to benefit its members.
A charity also has to meet a public benefit test. To qualify under this test, an organization must show that:
 its activities and purposes provide a tangible benefit to the public
 those people who are eligible for benefits are either the public as a whole, or a significant section of it, in that they are not a restricted group or one where members share a private connection, such as social clubs or professional associations with specific membership
 the charity's activities must be legal and must not be contrary to public policy
To register as a charity, the organization has to be either incorporated or governed by a legal document called a trust or a constitution. This document has to explain the organization's purposes and structure.

France 
Most French charities are registered under the statute of loi d'association de 1901, a type of legal entity for non-profit NGOs. This statute is extremely common in France for any type of group that wants to be institutionalized (sports clubs, book clubs, support groups...) as it is very easy to set up and requires very little documentation. However, for an organisation under the statute of loi 1901 to be considered a charity, it has to file while the authorities to come under the label of "association d'utilité publique" which means "NGO acting for the public interest". This label gives the NGO some tax exemptions.

Hungary
In Hungary, charities are called "Public benefit organizations". The term was introduced on 1 January 1997 by the Act on Public Benefit Organizations.

India
Under Indian law, legal entities such as charitable organizations, corporations, and managing bodies have been given the status of the "legal person" with legal rights, such as to sue and be sued, and to own and transfer property.

Ireland
In Ireland, the Charities Act (2009) legislated for the establishment of a "Charities Regulatory Authority", and the Charities Regulator was subsequently created (via a ministerial order) in 2014. This was the first legal framework for the registration of charities in Ireland. The Charities Regulator maintains a database of organizations which have granted charitable tax exemption, a list which was previously maintained by the Revenue Commissioners. Such organizations would have a CHY number for the Revenue Commissioners, a CRO number for the Companies Registration Office and a charity number for the Charities Regulator.

The Irish Nonprofits Database was created by Irish Nonprofits Knowledge Exchange (INKEx) to act as a repository for regulatory and voluntarily disclosed information about Irish public benefit nonprofits.

Nigeria
Charitable organizations in Nigeria are registerable under "Part C" of the Companies and Allied Matters Act, 2020. Under the law, the Corporate Affairs Commission, Nigeria being the official Nigerian Corporate Registry, is empowered to maintain and regulate the formation, operation and dissolution of charitable organisations in Nigeria. Charitable organisations in Nigeria are exempted under §25(c) of the Companies Income Tax Act (CITA) Cap. C21 LFN 2004 (as amended) which exempts from income tax corporate organizations engaged wholly in ecclesiastical, charitable or educational activities. Similarly, §3 of Value Added Tax Act (VATA) Cap. V1 LFN 2004 (as amended), and the 1st Schedule to the VATA on exempted Goods and Services goods zero-rates goods and services purchased by any ecclesiastical, charitable or educational institutions in furtherance of their charitable mandates.

Poland 
Public benefit organization (often abbreviated OPP) is a term used in Polish law, introduced on 1 January 2004 by the statute on public good activity and volunteering. Charitable organizations of public good are allowed to receive 1% of income tax from individuals, so they are "tax-deductible organizations". To receive such status, an organization has to be a non-governmental organization (political parties and trade unions do not qualify), involved in specific activities related to public good as described by the law, and be sufficiently transparent in its activities, governance and finances. Also data has shown that this evidence is to the point and makes sense.

Polish charitable organizations with that status include Związek Harcerstwa Polskiego, Great Orchestra of Christmas Charity, KARTA Center, Institute of Public Affairs, Silesian Fantasy Club, Polish Historical Society, and Polish chapter of Wikimedia Foundation.

Singapore
The legal framework in Singapore is regulated in the Singapore Charities Act (Chapter 37).  Charities in Singapore must be registered with the Charities Directorate of the Ministry of Community Development, Youth and Sports. One can also find specific organizations that are members of the National Council of Social Service (NCSS) which is operated by the Ministry of Social and Family Development.

Ukraine 
Legislation of charitable activity and obtainment of charitable organization status is regulated by the Civil Code of Ukraine and by Law of Ukraine Charitable Activities and Charitable Organizations.

By Ukrainian law, there are three forms of charitable organizations: 
 A "charitable society" is a charitable organization created by at least two founders and operates on the basis of the charter or statute;
 A "charitable institution" is a type of charitable trust, acts on the basis of the constituent or founding act; charitable organization whose founding act defines assets that one or several founders transfer to achieve the goals of charitable activity from such assets and/or income from such assets. A constituent act of a charitable institution may be contained in a will or testament. The founder or founders of the charitable institution do not participate in the management such charitable organization;
 A "charitable fund" or "charitable foundation" is a charitable organization that operates on the basis of the charter; has participants or members and is managed by them; participants or members are not obliged to transfer any assets to such organization in order to achieve the goals of charitable activity; charitable foundation can be created by one or several founders. The assets of charitable fund can be formed by participants and/or other benefactors.

The Ministry of Justice of Ukraine is the main registration authority for charitable organization registration and constitution. Individuals and legal entities, except for public authorities and local governments, can be the founders of charitable organizations. Charitable societies and charitable foundations may have (besides founders) other participants who have joined them in the way prescribed by the charters of such charitable associations or charitable foundations. Aliens (non-Ukrainian citizens and legal entities, corporations or non-governmental organizations) can be the founders and members of philanthropic organization in Ukraine.

All funds received by a charitable organization that were used for charity purposes are exempt from taxation, but it requires obtaining of non-profit status from tax authority.

Legalization needed for International charitable fund to make activity in Ukraine.

United Kingdom
Charity law within the UK varies among (i) England and Wales, (ii) Scotland and (iii) Northern Ireland, but the fundamental principles are the same. Most organizations that are charities are required to registered with the appropriate regulator for their jurisdiction, but significant exceptions apply so that many organizations are bona fide charities but do not appear on a public register. The registers are maintained by the Charity Commission for England and Wales and for Scotland by the Office of the Scottish Charity Regulator. The Charity Commission for Northern Ireland maintains a register of charities that have completed formal registration (see below). Organizations applying must meet the specific legal requirements summarized below, and have filing requirements with their regulator, and are subject to inspection or other forms of review. The oldest charity in the UK is The King's School, Canterbury established in 597.

The Transparency of Lobbying, Non-party Campaigning and Trade Union Administration Act 2014 subjects charities to regulation by the Electoral Commission in the run-up to a general election.

England and Wales

Definition

Section 1 Charities Act 2011 provides the definition in England and Wales:

(1) For the purposes of the law of England and Wales, "charity" means an institution which—
(a) is established for charitable purposes only, and
(b) falls to be subject to the control of the High Court in the exercise of its jurisdiction with respect to charities.

The Charities Act 2011 provides the following list of charitable purposes:

 the prevention or relief of poverty
 the advancement of education
 the advancement of religion
 the advancement of health or the saving of lives
 the advancement of citizenship or community development
 the advancement of the arts, culture, heritage or science
 the advancement of amateur sport
 the advancement of human rights, conflict resolution or reconciliation or the promotion of religious or racial harmony or equality and diversity
 the advancement of environmental protection or improvement
 the relief of those in need, by reason of youth, age, ill-health, disability, financial hardship or other disadvantage
 the advancement of animal welfare
 the promotion of the efficiency of the armed forces of the Crown or of the police, fire and rescue services or ambulance services
 other purposes currently recognized as charitable and any new charitable purposes which are similar to another charitable purpose.

A charity must also provide a public benefit.

Before the Charities Act 2006, which introduced the definition now contained in the 2011 Act, the definition of charity arose from a list of charitable purposes in the Charitable Uses Act 1601 (also known as the Statute of Elizabeth), which had been interpreted and expanded into a considerable body of case law.  In Commissioners for Special Purposes of Income Tax v. Pemsel (1891), Lord McNaughten identified four categories of charity which could be extracted from the Charitable Uses Act and which were the accepted definition of charity prior to the Charities Act 2006:
 the relief of poverty,
 the advancement of education,
 the advancement of religion, and
 other purposes considered beneficial to the community.

Charities in England and Wales – such as Age UK, the Royal Society for the Protection of Birds (RSPB) and the Royal Society for the Prevention of Cruelty to Animals (RSPCA) – must comply with the 2011 Act regulating matters such as charity reports and accounts and fundraising.

Structures
, there are a number of types of legal structure for a charity in England and Wales:
 Unincorporated association
 Trust
 Company limited by guarantee
 Another incorporation, such as by royal charter
 Charitable incorporated organization

The unincorporated association is the most common form of organization within the voluntary sector in England and Wales. This is essentially a contractual arrangement between individuals who have agreed to come together to form an organization for a particular purpose. An unincorporated association will normally have as its governing document a constitution or set of rules, which will deal with such matters as the appointment of office bearers, and the rules governing membership. The organization is not though a separate legal entity, so it cannot start legal action, it cannot borrow money, and it cannot enter into contracts in its own name. Its officers can be personally liable if the charity is sued or has debts.

A trust is essentially a relationship among three parties: the donor of some assets, the trustees who hold the assets, and the beneficiaries (those people who are eligible to benefit from the charity). When the trust has charitable purposes, and is a charity, the trust is known as a charitable trust. The governing document is the trust deed or declaration of trust, which comes into operation once it is signed by all the trustees. The main disadvantage of a trust is that, as with an unincorporated association, it does not have a separate legal entity and the trustees must themselves own property and enter into contracts. The trustees are also liable if the charity is sued or incurs liability.

A company limited by guarantee is a private limited company where the liability of members is limited. A guarantee company does not have a share capital, but instead has members who are guarantors instead of shareholders. In the event of the company being wound up, the members agree to pay a nominal sum which can be as little as £1. A company limited by guarantee is a useful structure for a charity where it is desirable for the trustees to have the protection of limited liability. Also, the charity has legal personality, and so can enter into contracts, such as employment contracts in its own name.

A small number of charities are incorporated by royal charter, a document which creates a corporation with legal personality (or, in some instances, transforms a charity incorporated as a company into a charity incorporated by royal charter). The charter must be approved by the Privy Council before receiving royal assent. Although the nature of the charity will vary depending on the clauses enacted, generally a royal charter will offer a charity the same limited liability as a company and the ability to enter into contracts.

The Charities Act 2006 legislated for a new legal form of incorporation designed specifically for charities, the charitable incorporated organization, with powers similar to a company but without the need to register as a company. Becoming a CIO was only made possible in 2013, with staggered introduction dates, with the charities with highest turnover eligible first.

The word foundation is not generally used in England and Wales. Occasionally, a charity will use the word as part of its name, e.g. British Heart Foundation, but this has no legal significance and does not provide any information about either the work of the charity or how it is legally structured. The structure of the organization will be one of the types of structure described above.

Registration
Charitable organizations that have an income of more than £5,000, and for whom the law of England and Wales applies, must register with the Charity Commission for England and Wales, unless they are an "exempt" or "excepted" charity. For companies, the law of England and Wales will normally apply if the company itself is registered in England and Wales. In other cases, if the governing document does not make it clear, the law which applies will be the country with which the organization is most connected.

When an organization's income does not exceed £5,000, it is not able to register as a charity with the Charity Commission for England and Wales. It can, however, register as a charity with HM Revenue and Customs for tax purposes only.  With the rise in mandatory registration level, to £5,000 by The Charities Act 2006, smaller charities can be reliant upon HMRC recognition to evidence their charitable purpose and confirm their not-for-profit principles.

Churches with an annual income of less than £100,000 need not register.

Some charities which are called exempt charities are not required to register with the Charity Commission and are not subject to any of the Charity Commission's supervisory powers. These charities include most universities and national museums and some other educational institutions. Other charities are excepted from the need to register, but are still subject to the supervision of the Charity Commission. The regulations on excepted charities have however been changed by the Charities Act 2006. Many excepted charities are religious charities.

Northern Ireland
The Charity Commission for Northern Ireland was established in 2009 and has received the names and details of over 7,000 organizations in Northern Ireland that have previously been granted charitable status for tax purposes (the "deemed list"). Compulsory registration of organizations from the deemed list began in December 2013, and it is expected to take three to four years to complete. The new Register of Charities is publicly available on the CCNI website and contains the details of those organizations who have so far been confirmed by the commission to exist for charitable purposes and the public benefit. The Commission estimates that there are between 5,000 and 11,500 charitable organizations to be formally registered in total.

Scotland
The 24,000 or so charities in Scotland are registered with the Office of the Scottish Charity Regulator (OSCR), which also publishes a register of charities online.

Taxation
Charitable organizations, including charitable trusts, are eligible for a complex set of reliefs and exemptions from taxation in the UK. These include reliefs and exemptions in relation to income tax, capital gains tax, inheritance tax, stamp duty land tax and value added tax.  These tax exemptions have led to criticisms that private schools are able to use charitable status as a tax avoidance technique rather than because they offer a genuine charitable good.

United States

In the United States, a charitable organization is an organization operated for purposes that are beneficial to the public interest. There are different types of charitable organizations. Every U.S. and foreign charity that qualifies as tax-exempt under Section 501(c)(3) of the Internal Revenue Code is considered a "private foundation" unless it demonstrates to the IRS that it falls into another category. Generally, any organization that is not a private foundation (i.e., it qualifies as something else) is usually a public charity as described in Section 509(a) of the Internal Revenue Code.

In addition, a private foundation usually derives its principal funding from an individual, family, corporation, or some other single source and is more often than not a grantmaker and does not solicit funds from the public. In contrast, a foundation or public charity generally receives grants from individuals, government, and private foundations, and while some public charities engage in grantmaking activities, most conduct direct service or other tax-exempt activities. Foundations that are generally grantmakers (i.e. they use their endowment to make grants to other organizations, which in turn carry out the goals of the foundation indirectly) are usually called "grantmaker" or "non-operating" foundations.

The requirements and procedures for forming charitable organizations vary from state to state, as do the registration and filing requirements for charitable organizations that conduct charitable activities, solicit charitable contributions, or hire professional fundraisers. In practice, the detailed definition of "charitable organization" is determined by the requirements of state law where the charitable organization operates, and the requirements for federal tax relief by the IRS.

Resources exist to provide information, even rankings, of US charities.

Federal tax relief
Federal tax law provides tax benefits to nonprofit organizations recognized as exempt from federal income tax under section 501(c)(3) of the Internal Revenue Code (IRC). The benefits of 501(c)(3) status include exemption from federal income tax as well as eligibility to receive tax deductible charitable contributions. There was a total of $281.86 billion tax deductible donations by individuals in 2017.

To qualify for 501(c)(3) status most organizations must apply to the Internal Revenue Service (IRS) for such status.

Several requirements must be met for a charitable organization to obtain 501(c)(3) status. These include the organization being organized as a corporation, trust, or unincorporated association, and the organization's organizing document (such as the articles of incorporation, trust documents, or articles of association) must limit its purposes to being charitable, and permanently dedicate its assets to charitable purposes. The organization must refrain from undertaking a number of other activities such as participating in the political campaigns of candidates for local, state or federal office, and must ensure that its earnings do not benefit any individual.  Most tax exempt organizations are required to file annual financial reports (IRS Form 990) at the state and federal level. A tax exempt organization's 990 and some other forms are required to be made available to public scrutiny.

The types of charitable organization that are considered by the IRS to be organized for the public benefit include those that are organized for:
 Relief of the poor, the distressed, or the underprivileged
 Advancement of religion
 Advancement of education or science
 Construction or maintenance of public buildings, monuments, or works
 Lessening the burdens of government
 Lessening of neighborhood tensions
 Elimination of prejudice and discrimination
 Defense of human and civil rights secured by law
 Combating community deterioration and juvenile delinquency.

A number of other organizations may also qualify for exempt status, including those organized for religious, scientific, literary and educational purposes, as well as those for testing for public safety and for fostering national or international amateur sports competition, and for the prevention of cruelty to children or animals.

Criticism 
Charity has received criticism. These criticisms include charity only addressing the symptoms of a problem instead of the causes of a problem, charity being a worse substitute for change that does not fix the fundamental injustices in the structures and values of a society, charity not providing the best solutions to problems in a society, charity resulting in less state funding of essential services, charity leading to favoritism instead of fairness, tax incentives for charity resulting in the worsening of social inequalities by reducing the revenue a state has available for social projects, inefficient charitable giving, charities misusing their funds, and some charities attaching conditions to their giving of aid.

Economist Robert Reich criticized the practice of billionaires giving some of their money to charity, calling it mostly "self-serving rubbish". Mathew Snow of American socialist magazine Jacobin criticized charity for "creating an individualized 'culture of giving'" instead of "challenging capitalism's institutionalized taking."

Charity regulators

 Australian Charities and Not-for-profits Commission
 Canada Revenue Agency
 Charity Commission for England and Wales
 Charity Commission for Northern Ireland
 Inland Revenue Department (Hong Kong)
 Office of the Scottish Charity Regulator
 United States Internal Revenue Service

See also

 Aid agency
 Charitable trust
 Charity watchdog
 Cy-près doctrine
 Foundation
 Grants
 Nonprofit organization
 Governance
 Social enterprise
 Mutual aid, alternative to charity
 World Giving Index
 List of charities accused of ties to terrorism

References

External links

 
Types of organization
Wills and trusts